Hans Sørensen may refer to:

Hans Laurids Sørensen (1901–1974), Danish  gymnast at the 1920 Summer Olympics
Hans Christian Sørensen (1900–1984), Danish  gymnast at the 1920 Summer Olympics
Hans Olav Sørensen (born 1942), Norwegian ski jumper
Hans Peter Sørensen (1886–1962), second Lord Mayor of Copenhagen
Hans Sørensen (sailor) (1900–1984), Danish Olympic sailor